Coan is an unincorporated community in Northumberland County, in the U.S. state of Virginia.

References

Unincorporated communities in Virginia
Unincorporated communities in Northumberland County, Virginia